The Nine Eleven Finding Answers Foundation (NEFA Foundation) was a tax exempt, 501(c)(3) organization, nonprofit, charitable organization engaged in terrorism research and analysis. Although NEFA lists a New York address for its headquarters on its website, the organization's business offices are located in Charleston, South Carolina, according to the latter's Secretary of State.

Background and goal
The Foundation was founded after the September 11 attacks. Its stated goal is "to help prevent future tragedies in the U.S. and abroad by exposing those responsible for planning, funding, and executing terrorist activities, with a particular emphasis on Islamic militant organizations."  It has worked with the 9/11 victims' families, and is funded by private donations.

Activities
The Foundation conducts research into terrorist activities. It funds extensive field research, and obtains relevant original documents (translated when necessary) and videos.  Media such as UPI, ABC, and Fox News have, in turn, used the documents, video, and translations provided by NEFA.

In the 2006 Ontario terrorism plot, NEFA posted on its website a video of the accused which got it from a British court that watched it during the trial of a man who has now been convicted of terrorism; Dan Brien of the Public Prosecution Service of Canada said, "We were interested to learn of the existence of this video, which we'd never seen before. We would've preferred to learn about it in some manner other than a U.S. website."  NEFA also carries interviews with Taliban commanders on its website. It was reported in November 2008 that NEFA was concerned about what it termed "a disturbing pattern of lone-wolf style individuals".

Staff
Michelle T. Hayes is its President and CEO, David Draper is its Director of Strategic Operations, Ronald Sandee (a former Dutch military intelligence officer) is Director of Analysis and Research, Evan F. Kohlmann, is its Senior Investigator.

Founders 

NEFA was founded by CEO, President and Treasurer Michelle T. "Mikie" Hayes and Director of Strategic Operations David Draper.  Hayes previously worked as a development officer at the Medical University of South Carolina's Cardiovascular Institute.

Hayes previously worked as the director of development for the Charleston, South Carolina-based Medical University of South Carolina's Cardiovascular Institute.

Draper previously worked as a contractor for the Charleston, South Carolina-based law firm Motley Rice. Draper is the owner of a Charleston, South Carolina-based company named D2.

Financial reports 

According to the IRS Form 990 filed by NEFA for Fiscal Year 2009 (signed by NEFA President Michelle Hayes on November 10, 2010):

NEFA President and Treasurer Michelle T. Hayes received $165,000 in compensation during FY2009.

D2, a company owned by NEFA Director of Strategic Operations David Draper, was paid $405,818 in "consulting fees" during FY2009.

See also

The Jawa Report

References

External links
The NEFA Foundation website

Foundations based in the United States
501(c)(3) organizations
Non-military counterterrorist organizations
Non-profit organizations based in South Carolina